Courtright is an unincorporated community in St. Clair Township, Lambton County, Ontario, Canada. It is located on the St. Clair River, south of Sarnia. It was incorporated as a village on June 25, 1907, and disincorporated in 1974.

References 

St. Clair River
Port settlements in Ontario
Communities in Lambton County